Evan Joe Ferguson (born 19 October 2004) is an Irish professional footballer who plays as a striker for Premier League club Brighton & Hove Albion and the Republic of Ireland national team.

Club career

Early life
A native of Bettystown, County Meath, Ferguson is son of former professional footballer Barry Ferguson who played for Coventry City, Colchester United, Hartlepool United, Northampton Town, Longford Town, Bohemians, Shamrock Rovers and Sporting Fingal during his playing career. He is of English descent through his mother. He began playing with well renowned Dublin schoolboy club St Kevin's Boys, before moving on to the youth section of League of Ireland club Bohemians, where he would play in the National Underage Leagues. In December 2020, he scored in his last game at underage level for the club as his side won the League of Ireland U17 Division, beating rivals Shamrock Rovers 2–0 in the final.

Bohemians
Ferguson made his debut in senior football on 11 July 2019: a 1–1 draw with Chelsea in a friendly at Dalymount Park, aged just 14 at the time which made him the club's youngest ever player at senior level. His competitive debut in senior football came on 20 September 2019, replacing Luke Wade-Slater late on against Derry City at the Ryan McBride Brandywell Stadium. Ferguson's first goals at senior level came on 28 January 2020, scoring two goals in a 4–2 pre-season friendly win over Drogheda United. He would go on to make four competitive appearances in total over his two seasons at the club.

Brighton & Hove Albion
In January 2021, he signed for the academy of Brighton & Hove Albion, who beat fellow Premier League club Liverpool to his signature. On 24 August 2021, he made his first team debut, replacing Enock Mwepu in the 81st minute of a 2–0 win away against Championship side Cardiff City in the EFL Cup second round. On 6 September, he was nominated for the Premier League 2 Player of the Month award for August. He scored his first ever professional goal, scoring Brighton under-23s equaliser in an eventual 2–1 away win at League Two side Northampton in the EFL Trophy on 2 November. Ferguson won his club's goal of the month competition for November 2021 for his goal against Everton U23s at Goodison Park. His first involvement in a matchday squad in the Premier League came on 15 December 2021, when he was an unused substitute in the home defeat against Wolverhampton Wanderers. Ferguson made a second appearance of the season for the senior side on 8 January 2022, coming on as a 76th-minute substitute where he assisted Jakub Moder's equaliser in the eventual 2–1 – after extra-time — away victory over West Bromwich Albion of the Championship in the FA Cup third round. Four weeks later, Ferguson made another substitute appearance again coming in the FA Cup, this time away at Tottenham Hotspur on 5 February, in a 3–1 defeat for the Seagulls. On 19 February 2022, Ferguson made his Premier League debut for Brighton, coming on as a substitute in the 3–0 home loss against bottom side Burnley.

On 24 August 2022, Ferguson set up Deniz Undav's first ever Brighton goal. He later scored his first Albion goal himself, set up by fellow academy player Cameron Peupion, in the 90+4th minute of the 3–0 away win over League One side Forest Green Rovers in the EFL Cup second round. On 19 October 2022, on his 18th birthday, Ferguson signed his first long-term professional contract at Brighton keeping him at the club until 2026. On 31 December, in the 4–2 home loss against Arsenal, he made his third Premier League appearance from the bench for the Seagulls where he scored his first career league goal. At 18 years old he became both Ireland and Brighton's youngest ever Premier League goalscorer. Three days later on 3 January 2023, Ferguson started his first Premier League match, scoring again in the 4–1 away victory over Everton. He went on to assist Solly March's goal. On 21 January, 2023, Ferguson came on as a substitute for Brighton in the 66th minute of their away game against Leicester City, and netted his third PL goal,  a header  in the 88th minute from a Pervis Estupinian cross, to make it 2–2 and grab a vital point for the Seagulls. Ferguson scored the only goal of the game on 28 February, sending Brighton through to the FA Cup quarter-finals after the away win at Stoke City, with this goal being his first ever goal in the competition. In the next round, the quarter-final, he scored his first career brace, scoring the second and third goals and having one ruled out in the 5–0 home win over League Two side Grimsby Town on 19 March.

International career
Ferguson has represented the Republic of Ireland at under-15, under-17 & under-21 level. On 27 August 2021, he was called up alongside Brighton & Hove Albion teammate Andrew Moran to the Republic of Ireland U21 for the first time, for the 2023 UEFA European Under-21 Championship qualifiers against Bosnia and Herzegovina & Luxembourg. He made his U21 debut in a 2–0 win over Bosnia and Herzegovina in Zenica.

Ferguson was called up to the senior squad for the first time in November 2022, for friendlies against Norway and Malta, with the 18-year-old describing that he was "absolutely buzzing" with being selected. He made his debut for The Boys in Green against Norway on 17 November, coming on as a 89th minute substitute for goalscorer Alan Browne in the 2–1 home defeat.

Career statistics

International

References

Living people
2004 births
Association football forwards
Republic of Ireland youth international footballers
Association footballers from County Meath
Republic of Ireland association footballers
Irish people of English descent
Bohemian F.C. players
Brighton & Hove Albion F.C. players
League of Ireland players
Expatriate footballers in England
Republic of Ireland expatriate association footballers
Republic of Ireland under-21 international footballers
Irish expatriate sportspeople in England
Republic of Ireland international footballers